Máel Ísa Ó Raghallaigh, also known as Myles O'Reilly (born 1636), was an Irish harper.

Ó Raghallaigh was a native of Killincarra, County Cavan, previously part of the Kingdom of Breifne, which his ancestors had ruled (see East Breifne).

He was the composer of the air known as Lochaber, first printed by Thomas Duffet in 1676.

See also
 Myles William Patrick O'Reilly, soldier and publicist, 1825–1880.

References
 New Poems, Songs, Prologues, and Epilogues, etc. , Thomas Duffet, 1676.
 Tea Table Miscellany, Allan Ramsay
 Irish Folk Music: A Fascinating Hobby

External links
 http://billhaneman.ie/IMM/IMM-V.html

1636 births
17th-century Irish musicians
Irish harpists
Irish-language singers
Musicians from County Cavan
Year of death unknown